Niagara West is a federal electoral district in Ontario. It encompasses a portion of Ontario formerly included in the electoral districts of Niagara West—Glanbrook, Welland and St. Catharines. It is currently represented by Dean Allison.

Geography

It consists of the towns of Grimsby, Lincoln and Pelham, the Townships of West Lincoln and Wainfleet, and part of the City of St. Catharines lying westerly of a line described as follows: commencing at the intersection of the northerly limit of said city with the production of Courtleigh Road; thence southerly along said production, Courtleigh Road, and Third Street Louth to Queen Elizabeth Way; thence easterly along Queen Elizabeth Way to Highway No. 406; thence generally southerly along said highway to First Street Louth; thence southerly along said street to the southerly limit of said city.

History

Niagara West was created by the 2012 federal electoral boundaries redistribution and was legally defined in the 2013 representation order. It came into effect upon the call of the 42nd Canadian federal election, scheduled for 19 October 2015.

Demographics 
According to the 2021 Canada Census

Ethnic groups: 90.4% White, 3.0% Indigenous, 1.9% South Asian, 1.3% Black

Languages: 86.3% English, 1.8% Dutch, 1.3% French, 1.2% Italian

Religions: 65.1% Christian (25.9% Catholic, 6.1% United Church, 5.8% Anglican, 4.6% Reformed, 2.0% Presbyterian, 1.4% Christian Orthodox, 1.3% Baptist, 1.1% Anabaptist, 1.0% Lutheran, 1.0% Pentecostal, 14.9% Other), 1.0% Muslim, 32.2% None

Median income: $46,000 (2020)

Average income: $59,250 (2020)

Members of Parliament

This riding has elected the following Members of Parliament:

Election results

References

Ontario federal electoral districts
Grimsby, Ontario
Politics of St. Catharines
2013 establishments in Ontario